The Afon Senni is a river in Powys, Wales which rises in the Fforest Fawr section of the Brecon Beacons National Park and flows northwards for  to a confluence with the River Usk at Sennybridge.

The river rises as Blaen Senni to the north of the peak of Fan Nedd and east of Fan Gyhirych  occupying a deep glacial trough until it reaches the hamlet of Heol Senni. Before reaching Sennybridge  it flows past the village of Defynnog, where it is joined on its left bank by its sole significant tributary, the Nant Treweryn (or Treweren).

The river name probably derives from a personal name 'Senni'.

The river is designated as a special area of conservation in respect of its population of three species of lamprey, twaite shad, European bullhead, Atlantic salmon and otter.

References

Senni
Senni
Senni